The Multinational Brigade South-East is an infantry brigade of the Romanian Land Forces. Until April 2017 the brigade was named 2nd Infantry Brigade "Rovine", but has since become one of Romania's contributions to NATO. The "Rovine" was deployed to Afghanistan and Iraq for peacekeeping missions.

History 
The brigade was formed on 1 April 1883, being named after the medieval Battle of Rovine, which took place in 1395. The brigade is currently subordinated to the 2nd Infantry Division, and its headquarters are located in Craiova.

Organization 2020 
 Multinational Brigade South-East (HQ MN BDE-SE), in Craiova
 20th Infantry Battalion "Dolj", in Craiova
 22nd Infantry Battalion "Romanați", in Caracal
  26th Infantry Battalion "Neagoe Basarab" ("Red Scorpions"), in Craiova
 325th Artillery Battalion "Alutus", in Caracal
 205th Air Defense Battalion "General Gheorghe Pârvulescu", in Craiova
 116th Logistic Battalion "Iancu Jianu", in Craiova

References

External links
   Official Site of the Romanian Land Forces
  Official Site of the 1st Territorial Army Corps

Brigades of Romania
Military units and formations established in 1970
Military units and formations of NATO